Ballinalee, sometimes known as Saint Johnstown, is a village in north County Longford, Ireland. It is situated on the River Camlin, and falls within the civil parish of Clonbroney. As of the 2016 census, the village had a population of 347 people.

Name
The village name in Irish, Béal Átha na Lao, (anglicised as Ballinalee) means "mouth of the ford of the calves". The village is also sometimes known as Saint Johnstown, a name associated with the local Church of Ireland church of St John.

History

The St Johnstown borough constituency in the Irish House of Commons was nominally representative of the town. In 1833, the Commissioners appointed by the UK Parliament to inquire into municipal corporations in Ireland reported that the corporation of the borough was "virtually extinct". The 1846 Parliamentary Gazetteer records:

Antoine Ó Raifteiri's poem "The Lass From Bally-na-Lee" references the town.

In 1798, the town was the scene of numerous summary executions of United Irish prisoners of war after the Battle of Ballinamuck in a field now called Bully's Acre.

During the Irish War of Independence (1919–1921), the town was the scene of the Battle of Ballinalee, where IRA leader Sean Mac Eoin (sometimes known as the Blacksmith of Ballinalee) was the leader of a well-equipped flying column known as the North Longford Flying Column. They defeated 100 members of the Black and Tans and the Auxiliary Division in Ballinalee on 4 November 1920. It was the only successful defence of a town by the IRA against Crown forces during the entire conflict. Within the parish is the ruins of Old Clonbroney; it was reportedly the home of the first convent in Ireland, which was founded by St Patrick around 440 AD.

There are two lakes in the parish. Corbeagh lake, or Currygrane Lough, is situated in the middle of the parish and is located within the townlands of Drumeel Corbeagh and Currygrane. It has four small islands on it and one, called "Round Island," is thought to be a Crannog or ancient settlement. The other lake is called Gurteen and is situated near the village and adjacent to the Maguire Park.

Henry Hughes Wilson was born in the area in 1864, and would become the British Chief of the Imperial General Staff before his assassination by Irish Republicans. He was born in Currygrane near the village.

Between 30 and 31 January 1953, a riot took place at the post office. The position of postmistress was re-appointed due to unscrupulous business activities. Sean Mac Eoin TD Fine Gael supported  the position of the former post mistress. A riot ensued also in support, causing damage and assault to the family and home of the newly appointed post mistress.

Amenities
The local Church of Ireland church is dedicated to St. John. This church was built to designs by the Cork-born architect John Hargrave and was completed in 1825.

There are two Roman Catholic churches in the parish; the Church of the Holy Trinity in the village and the Church of St James in Clonbroney.  Ballinalee was the site of the first convent in Ireland at Old Clonbroney. Its remains are still to be seen.

The parochial hall on the Granard road, was opened in 1939 and is dedicated to the memory of Thomas Ashe, the Irish patriot. The local national school is adjacent to the hall and is named after Saint Samhthann.

Transport
Donnelly's Pioneer Bus Service, a local bus company based in Granard, operate a route from Granard to Longford via Ballinalee. There are three journeys each way daily (no Sunday service)

Sport
The village's Gaelic Athletic Association team, Sean Connollys GAA Club, primarily plays Gaelic football. The club is named after Sean Connolly, the former IRA member who was born in 1890 near the club's grounds and died in the Selton Hill ambush in 1921. The club's grounds, "James McGuire Park",  are located on France Road.

The club grounds also hosts an 18-hole pitch-and-putt course, which is known as "The Acres" and a basketball and tennis court, concrete walkway, as well as gymnasium and meeting room. The underage section of the club goes under the name of the parish, Clonbroney. The club won the Senior Football Championship for the only time in 1919 as Clonbroney Camlin Rovers (later renamed Seán Connollys).

Community Games and soccer are also participated in at parish level.

Notable people
Micheál Carrigy
 Seán Mac Eoin
 Sir Henry Wilson

See also
 List of towns and villages in Ireland

References

Towns and villages in County Longford
Former boroughs in the Republic of Ireland